Hurlements en faveur de Sade (English: Howlings for Sade) is a 1952 French avant-garde film directed by Guy Debord. Devoid of any images, the film was an early work of Lettrist cinema.

Description
The image track of Hurlements en faveur de Sade contains no actual images, only solid white or solid black frames. It follows the sound track such that when there is speech the screen is white, and when there is silence the screen is black.

The sound track uses text détourned from Isidore Isou's book Esthétique du cinéma, John Ford's film Rio Grande, work by James Joyce, and the French Civil Code. The time between speeches becomes increasingly long throughout the film, and it ends with a 24-minute sequence of silence and darkness.

Production
Debord wrote the original script for Hurlements en faveur de Sade during the winter of 1951–1952. His notes outlined a combination of original scenes and found footage. Debord planned to use newsreel footage, images of himself and other Lettrists, painted film stock, and sequences of solid black. For the film's soundtrack, his notes included Lettrist poetry, text by Guillaume Apollinaire, and music by Antonio Vivaldi. In April 1952 Debord published his original scenario in Ion magazine along with a preface titled "Prolégomènes à tout cinéma futur" (English: "Prolegomena to Any Future Cinema").

Debord abandoned most of his original plan for the film and instead used no images at all. He used speeches delivered by himself, Gil J. Wolman, Isidore Isou, and Barbara Rosenthal.

Release
Hurlements en faveur de Sade premiered 30 June 1952 at the Ciné-Club Avant-Garde 52 in the Musée de l'Homme. The audience became unruly, and the screening was stopped after twenty minutes.

The film had its UK premiere in 1957 at the Institute of Contemporary Arts in London.

See also
 List of avant-garde films of the 1950s

References

External links
 

1950s avant-garde and experimental films
1952 directorial debut films
1952 films
French avant-garde and experimental films
French black-and-white films
Lettrism
1950s French-language films
1950s French films